Almere Sailors was a Dutch basketball club based in Almere. Established in 2020, the team played one season in the Dutch Basketball League (DBL), the highest level of basketball in the Netherlands. Home games are played in the Topsportcentrum Almere, which has a capacity of 3,000 people. A year later, the team left the league due to financial difficulties and filed for bankruptcy a few months later.

History

In July 2020, the Almere Pioneers announced their plans to enter the Dutch Basketball League (DBL). Due to the COVID-19 pandemic, entry requirements for the league were eased. Since its disappearance in the 2006–07 season, Almere had not played at the highest level. To separate its activities from the amateur club Pioneers, a new organisation was established. On 3 August, the name Almere Sailors was announced for the professional team. The name was chosen as the city of Almere was created after reclaiming land from the sea.

On 13 August, the Sailors announced Eric Kropf as their first head coach. On 27 August, the DBL announced the Sailors obtained a license for the 2020–21 season. On 16 September, the Sailors signed their first player in Papito Hersisia. The Sailors played their first ever DBL game on 3 October, losing 124–64 to power house Donar. The season was suspended and later resumed behind closed doors because of the ongoing pandemic. On 21 January 2021, the Sailors won their first ever DBL game against Apollo Amsterdam, 74–64 after overtime. Kropf was fired on 10 March 2021, assistant Gregory Tjin-A-Koeng was promoted to interim head coach.

In the 2021–22 season, the Sailors applied to play in the BNXT League, in which the national leagues of Belgium and the Netherlands have been merged. Tjin-a-Koeng remained as head coach. On 12 August 2021, the club however announced it decided not to join the new season due to the lack of necessary financial means.

A few months later, on 13 October 2021, the Almere Sailors organisation was declared bankrupt.

Players

Last roster
The following was the Sailors roster that played in the 2020–21 Dutch Basketball League:

Top scorers by season
The following players were the leading scorers for the Sailors in each DBL season:

Season by season

Sponsorship

Head coaches

References

External links
Official website (in Dutch)

Defunct basketball teams in the Netherlands
Basketball teams established in 2020
Sport in Almere
Dutch Basketball League teams